</noinclude>

Simon Zenebishi was an Albanian aristocrat and vassal of the Kingdom of Naples, who held the castle of Strovilo (Castrovilari), near Butrint, and was a member of the Zenevisi family of southern Albania. He probably dwelled in Corfu, and was later subject to the sovereignty of Alfonso of Naples.

Life
He was a grandson a John Zenevisi and a son of Thopia Zenevisi of the Zenevisi clan. The Zenevisi had established themselves as rulers in the region of Gjirokastër, ruled by John Zenevisi who in the late 14th century is a recorded as "sebastokrator". Simon appears in the historical records for the first time in a deal the Zenevisi had made with the Spata clan of the Despotate of Arta. As part of their alliance against the Despote of Epirus, Carlo Tocco, a daughter of Maurice Spata was married to Simon Zenevisi. This alliance held until 1413-14, when, due to unknown actions undertaken by Simon, the alliance between the Zenevisi and Spata broke and the Zenevisi allied with the Tocco instead.

In 1443, Simon Zenebishi built the Strovili fortress with Venetian approval and support. It was located near Saiata (Sayada), and above Vagenetia, the lands of his grandfather John Zenevisi. In 1454–55 he was recognized by Alphonso V as a vassal of the Kingdom of Naples.

He had a son, born and raised in Turkey, who had deserted from the Turks in 1454, who in 1455 asked the King of Naples to be baptized.

Aftermath
His son, Alessandro "Lech" Zenevisi, ruled Strovilo following Simon's death until 1473, when he sold the castle to Venice.

Ancestry

Name
In Catalan documents, his name is also spelled Simone Gimlixi and Gimbixi. An Albanian neologism of his name is Simon Zenebishi.

References

Sources
 

Simon
15th-century Albanian people
Republic of Venice nobility
Venetian Albanians
People of the Kingdom of Naples
15th-century Neapolitan people
15th-century Venetian people
1461 deaths